The Saho–Afar languages (also known as Afar–Saho) are a dialect-cluster belonging to the Cushitic branch of the Afro-Asiatic family. They include the Afar and Saho languages, which are spoken in Djibouti, Eritrea and Ethiopia.

Characteristic features of Saho-Afar include the following:
 Preservation of the pharyngeal fricatives // and //
 Consistent Subject-Object-Verb word order
 Unique numerals '7' and '8': Saho malħin, baħar, Afar malħina, baħra.
 A contrast of high and low tone; gender is often marked by a high-low tone pattern on masculine nouns, low-high on feminine nouns, e.g. báḍà 'son', bàḍá 'daughter'.
 The Cushitic prefix conjugation is used commonly (ca. 40% of the vocabulary), and is also applied to loanwords from Ethiopian Semitic.
 A general negative prefix má- is used in both the imperative and declarative moods. The past tense of suffix-conjugated verbs uses in addition a single negative suffix for both, the present tense lacks a distinct negative suffix entirely.

Notes 

East Cushitic languages
Languages of Djibouti
Languages of Eritrea
Languages of Ethiopia